The Educational Wealth Fund (EWF) is a registered charity in England and Wales. The EWF is building a permanent endowment fund to provide grants to non-selective comprehensive schools in the United Kingdom.

Overview
The EWF seeks to fund capital projects which provide schoolchildren, and their communities with a sense of awe, inspiration and wonder. It has five priority themes:

 Creative Arts
 Sustainability
 Local Culture
 Peace
 Mental Health

One of the stated aims of the EWF is to enhance the position of education within national culture,  citing calls by UNESCO and the OECD on the vital need to improve globally the image and status of the teaching profession.  The EWF notes that the highest performing education systems around the world are also supported by a national culture which prizes education and holds the teaching profession in high regard. To this end, the EWF seeks to raise the profile of education by funding projects which will create positive and inspiring stories about learning and teaching, such as; life-size dinosaur skeletons, wonderous libraries, art galleries, full-scale kitchen gardens, planetariums, world-class sculpture, landscaped gardens, music centres, and events involving renowned artists.

History
The charity was founded in 2020 by British science teacher Jason West FRSA. Since publication of its vision the EWF has attracted wide support from economists, academics, authors, artists, TV and cultural personalities, including two former Presidents of the Royal Society. Jason cites that he was inspired by Carl Sagan's 1994 Pale Blue Dot speech given at Cornell University which questioned the futility of conflict, and humanities vision for its place on Earth.

Notable patrons

Administration
The EWFs founder, Jason West, was appointed by the board of trustees to become its first Chief Executive in July 2020. The Board of Trustees include: Sir Peter Birkett (Chair from 2020), Junita Fernandez, Lucian J Hudson, Zoe Raven, Andrew Harris, Victoria Mayes, Richard Bywater, Robert Gifford, Stuart Young and Chris Bridgman MBE. Youth Advisors include Amy and Ella Meek founders of Kids Against Plastic.

References

External links
Official website

Educational charities based in the United Kingdom